San Gregorio d'Ippona is a comune (municipality) in the Province of Vibo Valentia in the Italian region Calabria, located about  southwest of Catanzaro and about  southeast of Vibo Valentia.

San Gregorio d'Ippona borders the following municipalities: Francica, Jonadi, San Costantino Calabro, and Vibo Valentia.

Demographic evolution

References

Cities and towns in Calabria